Gregor H. Lind was a Democratic Party member of the Montana Senate, representing District 50 from 2005 through 2008.

Lind currently lives in Missoula, Montana with his wife Monica Tranel and their three daughters.

References

External links
59th 60th Session roster profiles from the official MT State Legislature website
Senator Greg H. Lind (MT) profile from Project Vote Smart
Follow the Money - Greg Lind
2006 2004 2002 campaign contributions

Democratic Party Montana state senators
Democratic Party members of the Montana House of Representatives
1957 births
Living people